Park Hye-suk (born 15 July 1964) is a South Korean rower. She competed in the women's coxed four event at the 1984 Summer Olympics.

References

1964 births
Living people
South Korean female rowers
Olympic rowers of South Korea
Rowers at the 1984 Summer Olympics
Place of birth missing (living people)